Mandy Wei is a Taiwanese actress, model and host. She started her career as a model and then as a MTV host before starting a career in acting. Wei attended Soochow University and speaks Mandarin, Taiwanese and English.

Early life
Mandy Wei was born on September 5, 1984 in Taipei, Taiwan. She is the older of a two-child family, with a younger brother. She attended Taipei Municipal Neihu Senior High School and later Soochow University, majoring in International Business Trade. She has said she was, and showed images of herself being an overweight teen when growing up, weighing at 65 kg (143 lbs) at her heaviest. Her weight issue caused her to have low self-esteem problems during her teenage years. In her university years she decided to have a change in lifestyle by eating healthy and with daily exercise she was able to slim down to around 50 kg (110 lbs), which is the weight she has maintained.

Career

Modeling
Wei started her career in 2006 as a lingerie and swimwear model. She had modeled for lingerie brand NuBra Taiwan and appeared on spreads for FHM Taiwan and GQ Taiwan magazine. After gaining exposure through her modeling work she was chosen to appear in Jay Chou's 2008 music video Snake Dance (蛇舞).

Hosting
In 2008, MTV Taiwan offered Wei a VJ position to host their entertainment news program and music program "MTV FUN Music" (MTV FUN音樂) where she interviewed local musical acts. In 2012, Wei became the host for entertainment gossip news website Apply Daily Taiwan.

Acting
Wei got her start in acting as a supporting character in the 2008 idol drama ToGetHer (愛就宅一起), playing "Luo Sha Sha" (羅莎莎), the leader of a University mean girls cliche, who picks on a homely girl played by Rainie Yang and is a huge fan of a celebrity idol Mars, played by Jiro Wang. She spent the next few years playing supporting characters in sometimes forgettable dramas and other times more popular dramas such as 2011 Material Queen (拜金女王).

Her big break came in 2012 when she was cast as "Dr. He Cai Rong" (何采蓉) in SETTV's weekly hit drama Love, Now (真愛趁現在). Originally a minor supporting character, her chemistry with second male lead Bobby Dou (竇智孔) proved to be a winning combination and soon her role was expanded to a main supporting role.

After gaining recognition from Love, Now, Wei was offered her first leading role to star in Sanlih's Sunday night drama Deja Vu (回到愛以前). She played "Xu Hai Lin" (徐海琳), a desperate women on the brink of suicide who gives up the love of the man she loves in order to bring him back to life. The drama started out weak coming in last place during its premiere episode, but soon gained an audience by coming in first place in its time-slot on every episode after that.

With the success of Deja Vu Sanlih offered Wei another leading role in their 2014 Sunday night drama Say Again Yes I Do (再說一次我願意), playing "Shu Xin Kui" (舒芯葵), a woman who marries a man she just met on a whelmed, played by Lin Yo Wei, only to find out she can't stand him and divorces him abruptly only to meet him a few years later and falls in love with him again. For this drama Wei decided to change her look by drastically cutting off her long hair to a near pixie cut. Her appearance was a drastic change from her previous projects, but the drama was another rating success, coming in first place in every episode during its time-slot.

In mid 2015, Wei once again collaborated with Sanlih by starring in a romantic comedy opposite Jasper Liu. Wei played "An Xi" (安希), a caring and independent woman who cannot stand injustice. Since Wei's hair had not grown out since Say Again Yes I Do concluded filming, she had to wear hair extensions to obtain a more youthful appearance since she had flash back scenes when her character was a university student.

In 2016, Wei played the lead in Sanlih Friday night drama, Swimming Battle, alongside Kingone Wang. Wei played "He Yu Die" (何雨鰈), a woman who lost her memories.

Filmography

Television series

Films

As presenter

Music video appearances

Awards and nominations

References

External links

  
 
 Mandy Wei Weibo page

1984 births
Living people
Taiwanese television actresses
Taiwanese female models
Taiwanese film actresses
21st-century Taiwanese actresses
Soochow University (Taiwan) alumni
Actresses from Taipei